Eupithecia homogrammata is a moth in the family Geometridae. It is found in Russia, Japan and Korea.

The wingspan is about 12–15 mm.

Subspecies
Eupithecia homogrammata homogrammata
Eupithecia homogrammata kamtschatica Viidalepp & Mironov, 1988

References

Moths described in 1908
homogrammata
Moths of Asia